Jaime Oncins and Daniel Orsanic were the defending champions, but lost in first round to Magnus Norman and Marat Safin.

Jiří Novák and David Rikl won the title by defeating Lucas Arnold Ker and Donald Johnson 5–7, 6–2, 6–3 in the final.

Seeds

Draw

Draw

References
 Official Results Archive (ATP)
 Official Results Archive (ITF)

Stuttgart Open – Doubles
Doubles 2000